Events in the year 1995 in Ukraine.

Incumbents 

 President: Leonid Kuchma
 Prime Minister: Vitaliy Masol (until 1 March), Yevhen Marchuk (from 1 March)

Events 

 10 February –  The first Antonov An-70 prototype aircraft collided with an Antonov An-72 that was assisting with the An-70 test program over Borodianka Raion, killing all 7 crew members of the An-70.

Deaths 
 Dariya Nikitichna Dobroczajeva, botanist (1 December)

References 

 
Ukraine
Ukraine
1990s in Ukraine
Years of the 20th century in Ukraine